Dmitriyevka is a rural locality (a selo) in Kalinovskoye Rural Settlement, Gribanovsky  District, Voronezh Oblast, Russia. The population was 96 as of 2010. There are 2 streets.

Geography 
Dmitriyevka is located 34 km west of Gribanovsky (the district's administrative centre) by road. Kalinovo is the nearest rural locality.

References 

Rural localities in Gribanovsky District